Šampēteris is an old Riga neighbourhood on the Pārdaugava side of the Daugava river, with many houses built in the first part of 20th century still surviving.

Etymology
The area's name comes from the French word champêtre, which means 'rural, pastoral'. 

Neighbourhoods in Riga